EEX can refer to

 EEX Convention, see Brussels Regime
 European Energy Exchange, the energy exchange in Germany
 EEx equipment class 
 EEX (calculator key) (enter exponent), to enter numbers in scientific or engineering notation